The name Etau has been used to name four tropical cyclones in the northwestern Pacific Ocean. The name was contributed by the United States of America, and is a Palauan word for "storm cloud".

 Typhoon Etau (2003)  (T0310, 11W, Kabayan) – struck Japan.
 Tropical Storm Etau (2009) (T0909, 10W) – approached Japan and brought heavy rain.
 Tropical Storm Etau (2015) (T1518, 18W) - struck Japan and brought heavy rain.
 Tropical Storm Etau (2020) (T2021, 24W, Tonyo) - A weak tropical storm that made landfall in Vietnam as a tropical depression.

Pacific typhoon set index articles